The Berkeley Hills Tunnel is a tunnel which carries Bay Area Rapid Transit (BART)  through the Berkeley Hills between Rockridge station and Orinda station.

Design
While the tracks run in the median of California State Route 24 on both sides of the tunnel, the Berkeley Hills Tunnel allows the tracks to take a straighter alignment offset to the north of the Caldecott Tunnel.

The tunnel bores through the Berkeley Hills east of Berkeley and Oakland a distance of  through a variety of rock strata, most of which are soft and porous. The earthquake-active Hayward Fault bisects the tunnel about  inside the west portal (Oakland side). Pedestrian cross-tunnels are spaced every  for emergency evacuation in case of fire, etc. There is a ventilation structure at the east portal with roll-down doors that can close off the tunnel end to allow air to be sucked out or blown in.

By 2017, cumulative minor damage from fault creep had significantly reduced the tunnel's cross section, to the point where BART determined it was necessary to plan for repair and mitigation against future creep. The work, which includes excavating the tunnel walls and realigning the tracks, is expected to cost $60 million.

Construction
Construction of the tunnel began in early February, 1965.  The bores were holed through by March, 1967, and construction completed in July, 1968. The tunnel was opened for revenue service on May 21, 1973, with the Concord line.

Material removed in the construction of the tunnel was used as fill for a concurrent expansion of the Port of Oakland.

Incidents
On December 4, 2013, a BART train suffered mechanical braking problems and made an emergency stop in the tunnel near Rockridge station. Eleven people were treated for smoke inhalation.

See also
List of tunnels in the United States

References 

Berkeley Hills
Yellow Line (BART)
Railroad tunnels in California
Tunnels in the San Francisco Bay Area
Transportation buildings and structures in Alameda County, California
Transportation buildings and structures in Contra Costa County, California
Rail transportation in Oakland, California
Tunnels completed in 1973